Henry Robson (c. 1775 – 1850) was a Tyneside concert hall poet, songwriter and performer in the late 18th and early 19th century. His best known works were perhaps the narrative  poem "The Collier's Pay Week", and a poem "The Northern Minstrel's Budget", describing the repertoire of a travelling fiddler and piper.

Early life 
Henry Robson was born c. 1770 at Benwell, near Newcastle, Northumberland, and was
still residing in Newcastle in 1812 according to John Bell in his notes in "Rhymes of Northern Bards"). He worked as a printer for Mackenzie and Dent (who also printed the works of Bell) and also had his own small business, working  at home, where he had a small press.

Later life
Most of Robson's known works had been published by 1824.
He died on 21 December 1850 at his home in Grenville Terrace just behind City Road, Newcastle at the age of 75.
His Obituary read - "he had worked 60 years as a printer, was the oldest member of the profession in the town, and was much respected by a numerous circle of friends."

Works 
These include :-
 Collier's Pay Week (The) - from the collection "The Songs of the Tyne, being a collection of popular local songs. No.8", published by John Ross, Royal Arcade, Newcastle upon Tyne - The song describes life at Benwell in the early 19th century
 Ca' Hawkie through the watter - published c. 1810 - It is a well-known song, and one manuscript dated c 1820, and of a longer than normal version, is written in Robson's handwriting, but this may have been his writing down of the material for safe keeping
 Gateshead Fell
 Northern minstrel's budget - published 1824, in A Collection of Original Local Songs
 Pitman's Pay
 Sandgate Lassie's Lament (The) – to the tune of The Bonny Pit Laddie
 Sandgate wife's nurse song - published c. 1849, a song to be sung to baby while awaiting the return of the keelman husband
 Spring (The) - Written the beginning of May 1809
 Till the tide came in - written c. 1827, published c. 1837-1841, a song about waiting for the tide
 Tyne (The)

The introductory set of "Verses on Northumberland Minstrelsy" in Bell's Rhymes of Northern Bards, are signed H.R., presumably Robson:

'The Northern Minstrel's Budget', consisting mostly of a verse list of more than 200 tunes played by a single piper and fiddler in Northumberland at the beginning of the 19th century, is very useful as a picture of a working musician's repertoire, and also for the detailed forms of many of the titles, much fuller than in other sources.

See also 
Geordie dialect words

References

External links
 FARNE - Folk Archive Resource North East – The Collier's Pay Week
 Bards of Newcastle
Allan’s Illustrated Edition of Tyneside songs and readings

English singers
English songwriters
People from Newcastle upon Tyne (district)
Musicians from Tyne and Wear
1850 deaths
1775 births
Geordie songwriters